Aposphaeria is a genus of fungi in the family Melanommataceae. The genus was circumscribed in 1880 by Pier Andrea Saccardo, with Aposphaeria pulviscula selected as the type species.

Species
, Species Fungorum (in the Catalog of Life) accepts 84 species of Aposphaeria:
 Aposphaeria allantella 
 Aposphaeria anomala 
 Aposphaeria arachidis 
 Aposphaeria bambusae 
 Aposphaeria bombacis 
 Aposphaeria brunneotincta 
 Aposphaeria buddlejae 
 Aposphaeria calligoni 
 Aposphaeria canavaliae 
 Aposphaeria caraganae 
 Aposphaeria caricicola 
 Aposphaeria caulina 
 Aposphaeria charticola 
 Aposphaeria cladoniae 
 Aposphaeria conica 
 Aposphaeria corallinolutea 
 Aposphaeria dendrophomoides 
 Aposphaeria denudata 
 Aposphaeria desertorum 
 Aposphaeria elymi 
 Aposphaeria ephedrae 
 Aposphaeria epicorticalis 
 Aposphaeria eragrostidis 
 Aposphaeria eurotiae 
 Aposphaeria ferrum-equinum 
 Aposphaeria freticola 
 Aposphaeria gallicola 
 Aposphaeria gregaria 
 Aposphaeria halimodendri 
 Aposphaeria haloxyli 
 Aposphaeria hapalophragmii 
 Aposphaeria henryana 
 Aposphaeria heveae 
 Aposphaeria hippuridis 
 Aposphaeria hospitae 
 Aposphaeria humicola 
 Aposphaeria ilicis 
 Aposphaeria iliensis 
 Aposphaeria jubaeae 
 Aposphaeria kiefferiana 
 Aposphaeria kravtzevii 
 Aposphaeria lentisci 
 Aposphaeria lignicola 
 Aposphaeria major 
 Aposphaeria majuscula 
 Aposphaeria martinii 
 Aposphaeria mediella 
 Aposphaeria melaleucae 
 Aposphaeria mesembryanthemi 
 Aposphaeria mojunkumica 
 Aposphaeria montbretiae 
 Aposphaeria musarum 
 Aposphaeria nigra 
 Aposphaeria oxalidis 
 Aposphaeria pakistanica 
 Aposphaeria phellodendri 
 Aposphaeria pinea 
 Aposphaeria pini-densiflorae 
 Aposphaeria polonica 
 Aposphaeria populea 
 Aposphaeria pulviscula 
 Aposphaeria punicina 
 Aposphaeria purpurascens 
 Aposphaeria ramalinae 
 Aposphaeria reaumuriae 
 Aposphaeria rhois 
 Aposphaeria rostrata 
 Aposphaeria rubefaciens 
 Aposphaeria rudis 
 Aposphaeria salicis 
 Aposphaeria salicum 
 Aposphaeria santolinae 
 Aposphaeria sepulta 
 Aposphaeria sequoiae 
 Aposphaeria silenes 
 Aposphaeria sphaerospora 
 Aposphaeria striolata 
 Aposphaeria taquarae 
 Aposphaeria tiliana 
 Aposphaeria tragopogonis 
 Aposphaeria turmalis 
 Aposphaeria ulmicola 
 Aposphaeria zeae

References

Melanommataceae
Taxa described in 1880
Taxa named by Pier Andrea Saccardo
Dothideomycetes genera